Sumter County is a county located in the U.S. state of South Carolina. As of the 2020 census, the population was 105,556. In a 2018 census estimate, the population was 106,512. Its county seat is Sumter.

Sumter County comprises the Sumter, South Carolina Metropolitan Statistical Area, which, combined with neighboring Lee and Clarendon counties, formed the Sumter-Bishopville-Manning Combined Statistical Area, otherwise known as the "East Midlands" area.

It is the home of Shaw AFB, headquarters to the 9th Air Force, AFCENT, United States Army Central, with a number of other tenant units. It is one of largest bases in the USAF's Air Combat Command.

History

Sumter County was created from Clarendon, Claremont and Salem Counties as Sumter District in 1798, named after General Thomas Sumter, and became effective in 1800. When the home of Sumter District's clerk of records burnt in 1801, the formative records of the three predecessor counties were also destroyed in the conflagration. So documentary evidence that the three counties were within St. Mark's Parish (formed in 1757 from Prince Frederick's Parish, Craven County) in Camden District (formed 1769) derives from family genealogies and legislative records.

On 19 December 1855, a legislative act was passed partitioning Sumter District by forming Clarendon District, with the same boundaries as defined for Clarendon County in 1785. When effectuated in 1857, a northeastern part of Sumter District (formerly in Salem County) was also separated in the partition (the area east of a line drawn from the northernmost point of old Clarendon County continued north-northeasterly to a point on the boundary line with Darlington District (Sumter County's northeastern cornerpoint abutting Florence County since 1888).

The Sumter District gained a form of self-rule and was renamed Sumter County under the 1868 Constitution.

In 1898, a northwestern part of Sumter County was detached to form part of the first Lee County, but its formation was declared unconstitutional in 1899. In 1902, an even larger northern part of Sumter County (more or less the remaining part of former Salem County) was properly legally detached to form the major sections of the current Lee County, of which some acreage reverted in 1914.

In 1921 southern Sumter County received a section from Clarendon County, of which some acreage reverted in 1922, creating the current boundaries of Sumter County.

Geography

It is drained by the Black River and its tributaries. Its western border is formed by the Wateree River. One of South Carolina's most famous areas are the High Hills of Santee comprising the western part of the county. The county is one of five that borders Lake Marion, also known as South Carolina's "Inland Sea."

State and local protected areas/sites 
 Longleaf Pine Heritage Preserve/ Wildlife Management Area (part)
 Manchester State Forest
 Millford Plantation Historic Site
 Poinsett State Park
 Swan Lake Iris Gardens
 Tuomey Wildlife Management Area
 Woods Bay State Park (part)

Major water bodies 
 Congaree River
 Lake Marion
 Lynches River
 Pocoaligo River
 Rocky Bluff Swamp
 Scape Ore Swamp
 Wateree River

Adjacent counties 
 Lee County - north
 Florence County - northeast
 Clarendon County - south
 Calhoun County - southwest
 Richland County - west
 Kershaw County - northwest

Major highways

Major infrastructure 
 Shaw Air Force Base
 Sumter Airport

Demographics

2020 census

As of the 2020 United States Census, there were 105,556 people, 44,105 households, and 29,777 families residing in the county.

2010 census
As of the 2010 United States Census, there were 107,456 people, 40,398 households, and 28,311 families residing in the county. The racial makeup of the county was 48.2% white, 46.9% black or African American, 1.1% Asian, 0.4% American Indian, 0.1% Pacific islander, 1.4% from other races, and 1.9% from two or more races. Those of Hispanic or Latino origin made up 3.3% of the population. In terms of ancestry, 7.2% were Subsaharan African, 6.9% were American, 6.1% were English, 5.9% were German, and 5.7% were Irish.

Of the 40,398 households, 36.5% had children under the age of 18 living with them, 44.6% were married couples living together, 20.2% had a female householder with no husband present, 29.9% were non-families, and 25.8% of all households were made up of individuals. The average household size was 2.59 and the average family size was 3.11. The median age was 35.4 years.

The median income for a household in the county was $39,137 and the median income for a family was $45,460. Males had a median income of $36,101 versus $28,421 for females. The per capita income for the county was $18,944. About 15.5% of families and 19.4% of the population were below the poverty line, including 29.1% of those under age 18 and 14.7% of those age 65 or over.

Government and politics

Education
All areas in the county are in the Sumter County Consolidated School District. Additionally, the University of South Carolina Sumter is located in the county.

Communities

Cities
 Sumter (county seat and largest city)

Towns
 Mayesville
 Pinewood
 Rembert

Census-designated places

 Cane Savannah
 Cherryvale
 Dalzell
 East Sumter
 Lakewood
 Millwood
 Mulberry
 Oakland
 Oswego
 Privateer
 Shiloh
 South Sumter
 Stateburg
 Wedgewood

Unincorporated communities
 Horatio
 Wedgewood

Notable people
 Ray Allen, professional NBA basketball player is from Dalzell. 2× NBA champion. 10× All-Star.
 Freddie Solomon, Professional NFL Sumter, South Carolina (January 11, 1953 – February 13, 2012) Solomon won two Super Bowls as a member of the 49ers. On December 5, 1976, Solomon had a career game, with 5 catches for 114 yards and a touchdown, 1 rushing attempt for 59 yards and a touchdown, and a punt return for 79 yards and a touchdown.
 Confederate Lt. Gen. Richard H. Anderson of the American Civil War.
 Joseph (Jusef Ben Ali) Benenhaley (1753-1823) was the progenitor of the Turkish Community of Sumter County, a singular people-of-color ethnic group living mostly in Dalzell in the 1900s & with worship centered at Long Branch Baptist Church since 1904 & burials in its cemetery.
 Mary McLeod Bethune (1875-1955), civil rights activist, feminist, stateswoman, educator, founder of the National Council for Negro Women, born to parents who had been enslaved
 William Ellison was a Negro slave who was freed and settled in Stateburg, Sumter County where he became a large-scale slave owner and lived his life.
 David DuBose Gaillard of Fulton Crossroads was in charge of the building of the central portion of the Panama Canal.
 Angelica Singleton Van Buren, U. S. president's daughter-in-law and from Wedgefield.
 Richard Irvine Manning I, 50th Governor of South Carolina.
 Richard Irvine Manning III, 92nd Governor of South Carolina.
 George L. Mabry, Jr., Congressional Medal of Honor recipient and highly decorated soldier of WWII; a Major General.
 Sloman Moody, born in Horatio.
 Franklin J. Moses Jr., governor of S. C. in 1872, serving into 1874. Enemies labelled him the 'Robber Governor'. 
 Bill Pinkney of The Drifters was born in Dalzell.
 Ja Morant, professional basketball player, was the 2nd overall pick in the 2019 NBA draft by the Memphis Grizzlies.

See also
 List of counties in South Carolina
 National Register of Historic Places listings in Sumter County, South Carolina
 South Carolina State Parks
 List of South Carolina state forests

References

External links

 
 

 
1800 establishments in South Carolina
Populated places established in 1800
Majority-minority counties in South Carolina